Leon Rooke, CM (born September 11, 1934) is a Canadian novelist. He was born in Roanoke Rapids, North Carolina in the United States. Educated at the University of North Carolina, he moved to Canada in 1969. He now lives in Toronto, Ontario.

Rooke helped to found the Eden Mills Writers' Festival in 1989. In 2002, Rooke championed The Stone Angel by Margaret Laurence in that year's edition of Canada Reads. Rooke's work also appears in Blackbird: an online journal of literature and the arts.

In 2007, he was made a Member of the Order of Canada.

Bibliography
Approximately 350 short stories published;

Last One Home Sleeps in the Yellow Bed — 1968
Vault — 1973
Krokodile — 1973
Sword/Play — 1974
The Love Parlour — 1977
The Broad Back of the Angel — 1977
Cry Evil — 1980
Fat Woman — 1980 (nominated for a Governor General's Award)
Death Suite — 1981
The Magician in Love — 1981
The Birth Control King of the Upper Volta — 1982
Shakespeare's Dog — 1983 (winner of the 1983 Governor General's Award for Fiction)
A Bolt of White Cloth — 1984
Sing Me No Love Songs, I'll Say You No Prayers — 1984
A Good Baby — 1989
Daddy Stump — 1991
How I Saved the Province — 1989
The Happiness of Others — 1991
Who Do You Love — 1992
The Boy from Moogradi and the Woman with the Map to Kolooltopec — 1993
Muffins — 1995
Narcissus in the Mirror — 1995
Oh, No, I Have Not Seen Molly — 1996
Art. Three Fictions in Prose — 1997
Oh! Twenty-Seven Stories — 1997
Who Goes There — 1998
The Fall of Gravity — 2000
Painting the Dog: Selected Stories — 2001
Balduchi's Who's Who — 2005
Hot Poppies — 2005
The Beautiful Wife — 2005
Hitting the Charts: Selected Stories — 2006
The Last Shot: Eleven Stories and a Novella — 2009
The April Poems — 2013
Swinging Through Dixie — 2016
Fantastic Fiction and Peculiar Practices — 2016

References

External links

Leon Rooke's entry in The Canadian Encyclopedia
Blackbird: an online journal of literature and the arts

1934 births
Canadian male novelists
Living people
Members of the Order of Canada
Governor General's Award-winning fiction writers
American emigrants to Canada